The Beijing BJ20/BJ30 is a compact CUV produced by BAIC Motor since 2015. It was first introduced in 2015 as the BAIC BJ20, and later in 2020, it received a major facelift and was renamed to Beijing BJ30.



BAIC BJ20 (2015-2020)

First introduced as the BAIC BJ20 concept car at the 2015 Shanghai Auto Show and previously the Beijing Auto Concept 500 that debuted on the Shanghai Auto Show in April 2013, the BAIC BJ20 production model was launched in August 2016, with the final production version of the Beijing Auto BJ20 debuting on the 2016 Chengdu Auto Show in China. 

The BAIC BJ20 is based on the same platform as the Senova X65, and is powered by a Mitsubishi-sourced ‘4A91T’ 1.5 liter turbo engine producing 147hp and 210nm. The only transmission offered is a six-speed manual gearbox and only front-wheel-drive is available. 

Pricing for the BJ20 starts at 96,800 yuan and ends at 139,800 yuan ($14.300 – 20.600). Despite starting out as a fully original Beijing Auto Concept 500, the final concept and production model can often be related to the Toyota FJ Cruiser styling wise.

Beijing BJ30 (2021-)

Being essentially the facelift model of the BJ20, the BAIC BJ30 launched during the 2020 Guangzhou Auto Show in November 2020 is the first model to utilize Beijing Auto’s updated product naming system, using 2, 4, 6, 8-sequenced numbers for rugged off-roaders, and employing 3, 5, 7 and 9 monikers for urban off-road models. Compared to the BJ20, the BJ30 features a completely redesigned front and rear while still equipped with the same powertrain which is a 1.5-liter turbocharged gasoline engine producing 150 HP and 210 Nm (155 lb-ft) of torque, mated to a 6-speed manual transmission or a CVT.

References

External links 

Official website

BJ20
Cars introduced in 2015
Compact sport utility vehicles
Off-road vehicles
Front-wheel-drive vehicles
Retro-style automobiles
Crossover sport utility vehicles